Aluwa is a Sri Lankan sweet. It is made from roasted rice flour or potatoes with boiled treacle, cashew nuts and cardamom and is served in a flat cookie-like form.
 Aluwa is traditionally served in diamond or square shapes by using a wooden mould.

See also 
Halwa

References 

Sri Lankan desserts and sweets